The Volyn 2012–13 season is Volyn's 12th Ukrainian Premier League season, and their first season under manager Anatoliy Demyanenko. During the season Volyn Lutsk will compete in the Ukrainian Premier League and Ukrainian Cup.

Squad

The squad is given according to the club's official website, updated as of 9 August 2012.

Out on loan

Competitions

2012-13 Ukrainian Premier League

Results summary

Results by round

Results

League table

2012-13 Ukrainian Cup results

Squad statistics

Goal scorers

Appearances and goals

|-
|colspan="14"|Players who appeared for Volyn who left the club during the season:

|}

Disciplinary record

References

External links

FC Volyn Lutsk seasons
Volyn Lutsk